Jashon Cornell (born December 29, 1996) is an American football defensive end who is a free agent. He played college football at Ohio State.

Early years
Cornell was considered the number one ranked defensive end prospect in the state of Minnesota, and number seven DE overall, by ESPN for the class of 2015.

College career
Cornell redshirted in 2015 and only appeared in five games during his freshman year in 2017 due to a groin injury. During the 2018 season, he appeared in 13 games, where he recorded 14 tackles, 3.5 tackles-for-loss, and a forced fumble. He made his first start of his career on October 13, 2018, in a game against his hometown Minnesota Golden Gophers. During the 2019 season, Cornell started all 14 games and recorded 30 tackles, 6.5 tackles-for-loss, and four sacks. Following the season he was named an All-Big Ten honorable mention by both coaches and media.

Professional career
Cornell was selected by the Detroit Lions in the seventh round with the 235th overall pick in the 2020 NFL Draft. On August 2, 2020, the Lions signed Cornell to a four-year contract. He was placed on injured reserve on August 20, 2020.

On June 3, 2021, Cornell was suspended three games after violating the league's substance-abuse policy.

On November 10, 2021, Cornell was placed on the reserve/non-football illness list. He was activated on December 28.

On August 30, 2022, Cornell was waived/injured by the Lions and placed on injured reserve. He was released on September 5.

References

External links
Detroit Lions bio

Living people
American football defensive linemen
Detroit Lions players
Ohio State Buckeyes football players
Players of American football from Saint Paul, Minnesota
1996 births